WJHG-TV (channel 7) is a television station in Panama City, Florida, United States, affiliated with NBC and The CW Plus. It is owned by Gray Television alongside low-power dual CBS/MyNetworkTV affiliate WECP-LD (channel 21). Both stations share studios on Front Beach Road/SR 30 in Panama City Beach, while WJHG-TV's transmitter is located on SR 20 in unincorporated Youngstown, Florida.

History
WJHG was formed on December 1, 1953, as WJDM-TV and was owned by local businessman J. D. Manley. It became known by many people as "Wait Just a Darn Minute" (a play on its call letters) because it would frequently go off the air with technical problems.

At first, the station aired local programming such as church services and wrestling and went as an independent outlet for a short period of time before securing a primary affiliation with NBC and secondary affiliations with CBS and ABC. Mel Wheeler purchased the station in 1957, and in 1960, James Harrison Gray, the founder of Gray Communications (now Gray Television) bought the station and changed the call letters to the current WJHG-TV after his initials. It was the second television station in Gray's portfolio, after WALB-TV in Albany, Georgia.

WJHG dropped CBS in the 1960s after WTVY in Dothan, Alabama, became the default CBS affiliate for Panama City as well. That station's transmitter (in Bethlehem, Florida) is technically located in the Panama City market even though its primary coverage area is the Wiregrass Region of southeastern Alabama. On August 1, 1972, WJHG, along with then-sister station KTVE in El Dorado, Arkansas switched its primary affiliation to ABC, leaving the area without a primary NBC affiliate until WDTB (now WMBB) began in 1973 as the NBC affiliate. In 1982, WMBB and WJHG switched networks; WJHG returned to NBC.

In 1998, WJHG was almost sold when the Phipps family sold WCTV in Tallahassee to Gray Communications. Gray would have been forced to seek a waiver from the Federal Communications Commission (FCC) to keep both WJHG and WCTV under pre-1996 ownership rules because WJHG's grade B signal covers the extreme western parts of the Tallahassee market. The 1996 Telecommunications Act allowed for overlapping fringe signals, so Gray was able to keep both stations. Instead, Gray ended up selling its then-flagship station, WALB-TV in Albany, Georgia, because its city-grade signal overlapped that of WCTV's in the southwestern Georgia portion of the Tallahassee market. Even after the 1996 reforms, the FCC was not willing to even consider a waiver for a city-grade overlap. From 1998 to 2006, despite WPCT being a UPN affiliate until 2001, WJHG began airing UPN programming on a secondary basis, airing UPN programs in the late hours. This would continue until UPN and The WB merged operations in 2006 to form The CW, despite Panama City once again gaining its own UPN station when WBIF switched to UPN from PAX in 2004.

In 2002, Gray bought most of Benedek Broadcasting's stations. This included WTVY, whose transmitter provides a signal that covers all the way from Fort Walton Beach, Florida to Troy, Alabama. By this time, signal contours were no longer an issue and Gray could keep both stations. 
 
Since both stations had traditionally been available on cable in both the Dothan and Panama City area, and have the same ownership, WJHG has run WTVY stories that take place in those parts of northwestern Florida that are in northern part of the Panama City market. Meanwhile, WTVY has run WJHG stories focusing on Panama City and the coast.

Sometimes, WTVY will run its own stories on Panama City but WJHG did not cover Dothan at all (Southeastern Alabama's default NBC affiliate was WSFA from Montgomery). Gray launched low-powered WRGX-LD as a Dothan-based NBC affiliate on June 1, 2013, ending WJHG's availability in the Dothan market. On June 28, 2010, WJHG began broadcasting their newscasts in 16:9 enhanced definition widescreen.

Circle 7 logo

The station used a "Circle 7" logo as far back as the 1950s without objection from ABC, pre-dating the introduction of the now-common variation to its owned stations in 1962. At some point, however, the network trademarked said logo for exclusive use by its Owned-and-operated stations that shared the channel 7 dial position in several major television markets across the nation, with some channel 7 ABC affiliates also directly licensing the logo. In 1982, when Gray Communications switched WJHG's network affiliation to NBC, ABC ordered WJHG to cease using the logo. Station manager Ray H. Holloway produced archival film and still photographs that showed the local station had been using the "Circle 7" logo longer than the network.

To bring the matter to a satisfactory conclusion, the station elected to modify the logo. The modification was minor (the bottom of the circle was left open) but enough to pacify the network's executives, who were upset over the station's decision to "defect" to NBC. However, there are non-ABC stations still using designs similar to the Circle 7 logo including two of Sunbeam Television's stations, independent station WHDH in Boston and Fox affiliate WSVN in Miami.

On June 6, 2018, WJHG-TV underwent its most significant logo change yet, finally dropping the "Circle 7" logo after almost four decades.

Sometime in 2019, WJHG-TV changed frequencies from RF channel 18 to RF channel 16 as part of the FCC's spectrum repack.

WJHG-DT2
WJHG-DT2, branded on-air as Panama City CW, is the CW-affiliated second digital subchannel of WJHG-TV, broadcasting in 720p high definition on channel 7.2 via PSIP. All programming on WJHG-DT2 is received through The CW's programming feed for smaller media markets, The CW Plus, which provides a set schedule of syndicated programming acquired by The CW for broadcast during time periods outside of the network's regular programming hours; however, Gray Television handles local advertising and promotional services for the subchannel.

History
What is now WJHG-DT2 began on September 21, 1998, after WJHG entered into a partnership with The WB 100+, a national programming service operated by The WB for television markets ranked greater than 100, and cable systems in the Panama City area. Prior to 1998, The WB's programming was available in Panama City via WGN-TV's national feed or local WB affiliates, WDZL (later WBZL, now WSFL-TV) in Miami or WTMV (later WWWB, now WMOR-TV) in Tampa/St. Petersburg/Clearwater. It was a cable-exclusive station, and as a result, used the call sign "WBPC" (standing for "The WB Panama City") in a fictional manner for identification purposes. WJHG provided local advertisement opportunities and performed promotional duties for the outlet.

On January 24, 2006, CBS Corporation (which split from Viacom after 2005) and Warner Bros. Television (the company which owned The WB) announced they then would cease operating the UPN and The WB networks and combine their resources to create a programming service entitled The CW. The letters would represent the first initial of the new network's respective corporate parents.

On September 18 of that year, The CW officially launched nationwide at which point WJHG added a new second digital subchannel to simulcast "WBPC" and allowing non-cable subscribers access to the new network. With its over-their-air launch, "WBPC" began using WJHG-DT2 as its official calls and became part of The CW Plus, a successor to The WB 100+.

Programming

Syndicated programming
Syndicated programming on WJHG includes Jeopardy!, Wheel of Fortune, Rachael Ray, and The Kelly Clarkson Show. All except for the latter are distributed by CBS Media Ventures (Kelly Clarkson is distributed by NBC's corporate cousin, NBCUniversal Syndication Studios).

News operation

WJHG presently broadcasts 32⅞ hours of locally produced newscasts each week (with 5¼ hours each weekday, one hour on Saturdays and 1⅞ hours on Sundays); in addition, the station produces five hours of newscasts for sister station WECP-LD (at noon and 5:30 p.m. each weekday). The combined news operation results in over 37 hours of newscasts each week.

Notable former on-air staff
Jake Bell – sports anchor/reporter, feature reporter (2000–2002)
Kristen Berset – anchor/producer (now at WUSA-TV in Washington, D.C.)
Earl Hutto – news/sports anchor (1960s–70s; retired U.S. Congressman; deceased)
Shepard Smith – anchor/reporter (later at Fox News, now at CNBC)
David Steele – sports anchor (mid 1970s; now with Bally Sports Sun and the NBA's Orlando Magic)

Technical information

Subchannels
The station's digital signal is multiplexed:

Analog-to-digital conversion
WJHG-TV shut down its analog signal, over VHF channel 7, on February 17, 2009, the original target date in which full-power television stations in the United States were to transition from analog to digital broadcasts under federal mandate (which was later pushed back to June 12, 2009). The station's digital signal relocated from its pre-transition VHF channel 8 to channel 7. On December 19, 2012, WJHG received a construction permit to move from VHF channel 7 to UHF channel 18 (previously occupied by Panama City sister station WECP). WJHG's move to digital channel 18 (retaining virtual 7) and WECP's to channel 29 (virtual 18) took place on May 21, 2015, with the FCC issuing the station's license on June 5, 2015.

References

External links
Official website

Television channels and stations established in 1953
JHG-TV
NBC network affiliates
Ion Television affiliates
Dabl affiliates
Gray Television
1953 establishments in Florida